The men's 60 metres at the 2018 IAAF World Indoor Championships took place on 3 March 2018.

Summary
Fifteen years after his first silver medal, remarkable 43-year-old Kim Collins returned to yet another World Championship, qualifying for the semi-final round, but he did not start.  The favorite in the event was Christian Coleman, just two weeks after his second world record in this event this season.  While two American athletes qualifying for the final is not uncommon, two Chinese athletes qualifying for the final might be the sign of a new trend.

In the final, Coleman was out fast, but next to him in the center of the track Su Bingtian was out with him.  Ján Volko and Emre Zafer Barnes were also out fast, but faded quickly.  Giving ground at the beginning, Ronnie Baker hit his top speed mid-race, about the same time as Coleman reached his.  Coleman managed a little separation from Su, while Baker was making up lost ground.  Su continued to press Coleman to the line, but Coleman finished strongly with a lean for a metre victory.  Su barely held off the fast closing Baker to take the first global medal for a Chinese sprinter.  Behind the medalists, Zhenye Xie gave China a 2-4 punch as he barely held off the last to fifth explosion by Hassan Taftian.

Coleman's winning time of 6.37 would have been the world record prior to his other efforts this season.  Su improved upon his own Asian record, his third consecutive national record at the World Indoor Championships.

Results

Heats
The heats were started at 10:15.

Semifinal
The semifinals were started at 19:11.

Final

The final was started at 21:09.

References

60 metres
60 metres at the World Athletics Indoor Championships
2018 in men's athletics